Euchlanidae is a family of rotifers belonging to the order Ploima.

Genera:
 Beauchampiella Remane, 1929
 Dipleuchlanis de Beauchamp, 1910
 Diplois Gosse, 1886
 Euchlanis Ehrenberg, 1832
 Pseudoeuchlanis Dhanapathi, 1978
 Tripleuchlanis Myers, 1930

References

Ploima
Rotifer families